The Order of CúChulainn is the highest award for adults in Scouting Ireland.

History
It was introduced in 2004 to replace Scouting Ireland (CSI)'s Order of the Silver Wolfhound  and the equivalent award of Scouting Ireland S.A.I., the Order of the Silver Elk. The first awards were presented at Larch Hill with all those who held the highest award of the previous associations being invested as Honorary Members of the Order of CúChulainn by Martin Burbridge, the Chief Scout.

Origin of the name
In Irish mythology, Cúchulainn ('Hound of Culann') is the pre-eminent hero of Ulster in the Ulster Cycle. The image of Cúchulainn is invoked by both Irish Nationalists and Ulster Unionists, in murals, poetry, literature and other art forms.

Requirements
The Award is presented for outstanding commitment to Scouting over many years. Investiture into the Order is only made at functions with an appropriate level of importance. It is presented by the Chief Scout except in circumstances whereby they are unable to attend and another appropriate presenter is chosen.

Insignia

Order pendant
Members of the Order wear a yellow and red ribbon around the neck from which a miniature replica of a hound hangs, along with the World Crest. It is one of only four items which may be worn around the neck by members of Scouting Ireland, the others being the Lanyard, the Wood Badge and most commonly, the Neckerchief.

Citation
Each member receives a certificate, on which there is a citation which details the Scouting career of the recipient and reasons why he/she has been deemed to have made an exceptional contribution to the provision of Scouting in Ireland. The citation is read formally before the presentation is made.

Order pin
An Order of CuChulainn pin may be worn on the adult award ribbon. The pin consists of a hound, identical to that on the pendant.

Similar awards
The Boy Scouts of America Silver Buffalo Award is an international equivalent award to the Order of CúChulainn. Unlike the Silver Buffalo, however, The Order is always presented to an active member of Scouting Ireland. Honorary membership may be offered to significant public figures in recognition of their achievements. This honorary membership does not confer membership of the Order of CúChulainn.
The Scout association (UK) awards the Silver Wolf. Scouts Australia awards the Silver Kangaroo. Scouts New Zealand awards the Order of the Silver Kawaka. The Order of the Silver Elephant is awarded in India. The World Organization of the Scout Movement awards the Bronze Wolf.

References

Scout and Guide awards
Scouting Ireland